Bdellozonium is a genus of millipedes in the family Polyzoniidae. There are at least four described species in Bdellozonium.

Species
These four species belong to the genus Bdellozonium:
 Bdellozonium cerviculatum Cook & Loomis, 1928
 Bdellozonium quicki (Chamberlin, 1954)
 Bdellozonium rothi Chamberlin, 1950
 Bdellozonium sequoium Chamberlin, 1941

References

Further reading

 
 

Polyzoniida
Articles created by Qbugbot